Trigonopterus reticulatus is a species of flightless weevil in the subfamily Cryptorhynchinae. It is endemic to Sulawesi, Indonesia.

Description 
The species is endemic to central Sulawesi in Indonesia. The species was described in May 2019. It measures  in length.

References 

reticulatus
Beetles of Indonesia
Endemic fauna of Indonesia
Fauna of Sulawesi
Beetles described in 2019